The Benjamin T. Powell House is a historic house at 305 California Avenue in Camden, Arkansas.  The two story wood-frame house was built in 1859, and is one a few pre-Civil War cotton-magnate houses to survive in the city.  The house has a cypress frame, and features a Classical Revival facade with a front gable supported by four round columns sheltering porches with ornamental iron railings.  The house was used as a military headquarters by Union Army forces during the Civil War.

The house was listed on the National Register of Historic Places in 1974.

See also
National Register of Historic Places listings in Ouachita County, Arkansas

References

Houses on the National Register of Historic Places in Arkansas
Neoclassical architecture in Arkansas
Houses completed in 1859
Houses in Ouachita County, Arkansas
Buildings and structures in Camden, Arkansas
National Register of Historic Places in Ouachita County, Arkansas
1859 establishments in Arkansas